Miley is an English, Irish, and American family name. In America, it is a family name of predominantly Irish origin, although some claim German origin that was originally spelled Meiley.

Notable people with the surname include: 
 Arthur Miley (born 1993), American football player
 Dave Miley (born 1962), American baseball player and manager
 George H. Miley (born 1933), American physicist
 George K. Miley (born 1942), Irish-Dutch astronomer
 Hannah Miley (born 1989), Scottish swimmer
 Henry A. Miley, Jr. (1915–2010), US Army four-star general
 James "Bubber" Miley (1903–1932), American jazz musician
 Jessi Miley-Dyer (born 1986), Australian surfer
 John Miley (1813–1895), American Methodist theologian
 Mark Miley, Irish Gaelic football and hurling player
 Michael Miley (born 1974), American drummer for the Rival Sons
 Mike Miley (1953–1973), American baseball player
 Peggy Miley (born 1941), American actress
 Tim Miley (born 1966), American politician, attorney, and author from West Virginia
 Wade Miley (born 1986), American baseball player
 William M. Miley (1897–1997), US Army officer

See also
Miley (given name)

References